Emma Carol Hayes  (born 18 October 1976) is an English professional football manager. She is currently the manager of FA WSL club Chelsea Women. She previously served as the head coach and director of football operations for Chicago Red Stars of Women's Professional Soccer in the United States from 2008 until 24 May 2010.

Early life

Hayes was born in Camden, London, and attended Parliament Hill School. She then studied at Liverpool Hope University, graduating in 1999. 

Hayes joined Arsenal's academy but a career-ending ankle injury while on a ski trip when she was 17 cut-short her playing career. With football ruled out, Hayes took European Studies, Spanish, and Sociology at Liverpool Hope college and later a Master's degree in Intelligence and International Affairs.

Career
Hayes's first coaching job was as the manager of the Long Island Lady Riders between 2001 and 2003. She was head women's football coach at Iona College in New Rochelle between 2003 and 2006, and first team assistant coach and academy director for Arsenal Ladies between 2006 and 2008.

Hayes joined Chicago Red Stars as a manager in 2008. After she was sacked in 2010, she took up a technical director role at Western New York Flash and advised them on transfers, helping to create a team that won the 2011 Women's Professional Soccer championship. After another stint as a consultant for Washington Freedom, Hayes returned to London and worked for the family business, Covent Garden FX, a currency exchange.

In August 2012, Hayes landed the Chelsea FC Women job replacing Liverpool-bound Matt Beard.

She was appointed Officer of the Order of the British Empire (OBE) in the 2022 New Year Honours for services to association football.

2015 season 

After narrowly missing out on the 2014 FA WSL 1 title on the final day, Hayes oversaw a huge squad overhaul that bore witness to the addition of several arrivals. Swedish shot-stopper Hedvig Lindahl and promising England centre-half Millie Bright among the new recruits. Marija Banusic, Gemma Davison and Niamh Fahey also joined Chelsea, signing from Kristianstads, Liverpool Ladies and Arsenal Ladies respectively. Later on in the season, Hayes won the race for Reading & England forward Fran Kirby for a British record fee. With the agonising memories of final-day defeat still fresh in memory, Hayes guided her side to an historic league and cup double, edging the FA Cup Final thanks to a lone strike from Ji So-yun late on in the first half. Later on in the season, they avenged themselves by winning The FA WSL 1 title, after hammering Sunderland at home 4–0 to secure the trophy.

In the Women's Champions League, Hayes's side reached the last 16 after defeating Glasgow City. After their 2–1 home defeat by VfL Wolfsburg, Hayes criticised The Football Association for poor fixture scheduling, insisting that the competition is "geared to French, German and Swedish teams, and until we change that or listen to clubs like Chelsea we are always going to get knocked out in the early rounds".

2016–17 season 

Hayes's side finished second in The FA WSL 1, five points adrift of Champions Manchester City. The Blues also reached the FA Cup Final for the second consecutive year, losing 1–0 to a strong Arsenal side. Chelsea however won the FA WSL Spring Series, an interim edition of the FA WSL. Haye led the side to first place, finishing on the same points as Manchester City but beating them on goal difference.

Hayes was appointed Member of the Order of the British Empire (MBE) in the 2016 Birthday Honours for services to football.

2017–18 season 
Aided with addition of new players including Ramona Bachmann, Maren Mjelde, Erin Cuthbert and Crystal Dunn, Emma Hayes guided her side to finish top, in a reorganised FA WSL1, on goal difference.

The team also played the FA Cup competitions and reached the semi-final but were knocked out by Birmingham City in a penalty shoot-out.

2019–20 season 

Hayes sought to rebuild the team at the conclusion of the 2017–18 season around new recruits Sam Kerr, Pernille Harder, Melanie Leupolz, Magda Eriksson, and Ann Katrin Berger having moved on some key first-team players. The 2019–20 and 2020–21 season saw her team win back-to-back WSL titles in what were record breaking years, following a trophy-less 2018–19 campaign. Given Chelsea's dominance in the 2020–21 season in both Europe and England, some observers hailed them as one of the best teams ever. Hayes became the first woman manager to reach the Champions League final in 12 years. On 16 May, her Chelsea team, also playing their first-ever Champions League final, lost 4–0 to Barcelona Femeni.

Hayes won the 2020–21 FA WSL Manager of the Season award. Two months later, she signed a new long-term contract with Chelsea. The same year Hayes was inducted into FA WSL Hall of Fame. Based on the 2019–20 season, on 18 January 2021, she was adjudged The Best FIFA Football Coach beating off competition from Lluís Cortés and Sarina Wiegman..

2020–21 season 

Hayes won FA WSL Manager of the Season for a third season running after her team won the FA Cup and the League domestic double, and finished runners-up to Man City in the League Cup. Based on the 2020–21 season, on 17 January 2022, she was adjudged The Best FIFA Football Coach.

Personal life
In 2018, Hayes was pregnant with twins, but lost one of them, Albie, 28 weeks in. She gave birth to the surviving twin, Harry, on 17 May 2018.

Hayes credits Vic Akers, former Arsenal Women FC manager under whom she was part of the backroom staff when they won an unprecedented quadruple in the 2006–07 season, for being a "massive" influence on her career. Speaking of her experience coaching in the United States she said though she was born in England, she was definitely made in America.

Chelsea forward Fran Kirby, who suffered from severe depression after the loss of her mother early in her life and from a career-threatening illness in her late 20s, is particularly close to Hayes. Speaking of Hayes's positive influence in her life she said, "Emma's been incredible. She's been my rock; the person who made sure I was protected from everything." Former Chelsea and England player, Karen Carney, also praised Hayes for being there when she felt the most vulnerable and isolated.

Managerial statistics

All competitive league, cup and European games are included.

Managerial honours
Chelsea Women
 FA Women's Super League (5): 2015, 2017–18, 2019–20, 2020–21, 2021–22
 FA WSL Spring Series (1): 2017
 Women's FA Cup (4): 2014–15, 2017–18, 2020–21, 2021–22
 FA Women's League Cup (2): 2019–20, 2020–21
 Women's FA Community Shield (1): 2020

Individual
The Best FIFA Football Coach: 2021
FA WSL Manager of the Season: 2015, 2018, 2020, 2021, 2022
FA WSL Manager of the Month: October 2019, January 2020, February 2020, January 2021, March 2022
Women's Super League Hall of Fame: 2021
Orders
 Officer of the Order of the British Empire (OBE): 2022
 Member of the Order of the British Empire (MBE): 2016

References

1976 births
Living people
Arsenal W.F.C. non-playing staff
People from Camden Town
Alumni of Liverpool Hope University
Expatriate soccer managers in the United States
Women's Super League managers
English women's football managers
Officers of the Order of the British Empire
Chelsea F.C. Women managers
Chicago Red Stars coaches
Women's Professional Soccer coaches
WSL Hall of Fame inductees